P.A. Aziz College of Engineering & Technology (In Malayalam പി.എ. അസീസ് കോളേജ് ഓഫ് എഞ്ചിനീയറിങ്ങ് & ടെക്ക്‌നോളജി) or PAACET, was established in 2003 under the patronage of the P.A. Aziz Trust. The college is located at Karakulam, seven kilometers from Kowdiar Palace, Trivandrum city in southern Kerala, India.

The college is affiliated with the University of Kerala. Admission to the college is based on entrance examinations conducted by the Commissioner of Entrance Examinations, Kerala.



Origins
The college is a tribute to the late P.A. Aziz, who was a social, political and trade union leader, devoting his life to uplifting the weaker sections in Kerala. The college is managed by family members, and the chairman is Mr. Mohammed Thaha, who brings in international exposure and practices along with the great vision to build a world class institution.
The college received affiliation from APJ Abdul Kalam Technological University, under the Government of Kerala in 2017.

Aims
The institution is a manifestation of a long felt need to cater to the demands of the increasing number of undergraduates opting for technical education. The primary objective of PAACET is to promote higher education and research in the field of technology and to groom young men and women into technocrats, in whose hands the future of our nation is assured. The college provides the following B.tech courses, namely: 
 Computer Science and Engineering
 Mechanical Engineering
 Electrical & Electronics Engineering
 Electronics & Communication Engineering
 Applied Electronics & Instrumentation Engineering
 Civil Engineering,
In addition to this, it also provides an MCA course(Two year).

The College also has five Polytechnic Diploma (three year ) Courses namely
 Civil Engineering
 Mechanical Engineering
 Computer Engineering
 Automobile Engineering
 Biomedical Engineering

Location
The college is located at a scenic campus, 500 meters above the sea level, at Karakulam. The college is ten kilometers from Kowdiar Palace, Trivandrum City in southern Kerala. The campus is spread over 37 acres of landscaped land. The college is fifteen kilometres away from Thiruvananthapuram Central railway station.

See also

 AICTE
 APJ Abdul Kalam Technological University

References

External links 
 
 

Private engineering colleges in Kerala
Engineering colleges in Thiruvananthapuram
All India Council for Technical Education
Colleges affiliated to the University of Kerala
Educational institutions established in 2003
2003 establishments in Kerala